Montreal and its suburbs have a substantial Italian Canadian community. As of 2021, 17.3% of the ethnic Italians in Canada live in Greater Montreal.

Montreal's Italian community is one of the largest in Canada, second only to Toronto. With 267,240 residents of Italian ancestry as of the 2021 census in Greater Montreal, Montreal has many Italian districts, such as La Petite-Italie, Saint-Leonard (Città Italiana), Rivière-des-Prairies, Montreal-Nord, LaSalle, and the Saint-Raymond area of Notre-Dame-de-Grâce; the community has also since spread into Laval and the West Island suburbs. Italian is the third most spoken language in Montreal and in the province of Quebec.

History

In 1893 there were about 1,400 ethnic Italians in Montreal. During this time, Italian employment agencies that worked with Canadian steamship and railway companies attracted many Italian labourers to Montreal. Additional growth in the Italian population took place in the 20th century. The 1905, the Royal Commission appointed to Inquire into the Immigration of Italian Labourers to Montreal and alleged Fraudulent Practices of Employment Agencies was launched into deceptive tactics used by padroni, labour brokers that recruited Italian workers for Canadian employers. The commission recommended that the city of Montreal pass a by-law requiring immigration agents and offices to be licensed before being permitted to carry out their business.

The first Catholic church for the Italians became Mount Carmel Parish in 1905. It was established by an Italian-speaking man, Canon Bruchési. In 1911 the second Italian parish opened.

The political unit of the Italian community split after Benito Mussolini became the leader of Italy in the 1920s. During World War II the Canadian government opposed pro-Mussolini elements in the Montreal Italian community.

The Order of the Sons of Italy in Montreal dedicated a statue of the Italian navigator and explorer John Cabot in 1935. The order suggested that Cabot, and not Jacques Cartier, was in fact the first European to reach Canada.

Demographics

In 1931, there were more Italians than people of British origins in St. Jean Ward. During that year, in 19 of Montreal's 35 wards, the Italians were the largest non-French and non-British ethnic group. This was also the case in five other cities and towns in Greater Montreal.

See also

 Demographics of Montreal
 Church of the Madonna della Difesa
 Guido Nincheri
 Il Cittadino Canadese
 Il Duce Canadese
 Via Italia
 Ciao Bella (TV series)
 Mambo Italiano (film)
 1991 (film)
 Italians in Toronto

References
 Harney, Nicholas DeMaria. "Ethnicity, Social Organization, and Urban Space: A Comparison of Italians in Toronto and Montreal" (Chapter 6). In: Sloan, Joanne (editor). Urban Enigmas: Montreal, Toronto, and the Problem of Comparing Cities (Volume 2 of Culture of Cities). McGill-Queen's Press (MQUP), January 1, 2007. , 9780773577077. Start p. 178.

Notes

 Some material originated from Demographics of Montreal#Italians

Further reading
 Salvatore, Filippo. Fascism and the Italians of Montreal: An Oral History, 1922-1945 (Volume 35 of Essay series). Guernica Editions, 1998. , 9781550710588 (See preview at Google Books)
 Boissevain, Jeremy. The Italians of Montreal: Social Adjustment in a Plural Society (Volume 7 of Studies of the Royal Commission on Bilingualism and Biculturalism). Information Canada, 1974. See profile at Google Books
 De Martinis, Lucio. Italian Identity in Montreal: Issues of Intergenerational Ethnic Retention (Canadian theses). McGill University (soo ks
 el Balso. The Italians of Montreal: From Sojourning to Settlement, 1900-1921. Associazione di Cultura Popolare Italo-Quebecchese Books
 rs without a Cause: Italian Immigrant Labour in Montreal: 1880-1930." In: Arrangiarsi: The Italian Immigration Experience in Canada. Eds. Roberto Perin and Franc Sturino. Montreal: Guernica, 1989.

European-Canadian culture in Montreal
 
Montreal